Sandra Tola Harvey (née Casañas, January 19, 1962 – December 15, 2008), professionally known as Sandeé or Sandée, was an American freestyle music vocalist and an original member of the trio Exposé from 1984 to 1986, along with Alejandra "Alé" Lorenzo and Laurie Miller.

As a solo artist, Sandée released the singles "You're the One" and "Notice Me" (produced by C+C Music Factory), and an album, Only Time Will Tell, featuring the single "Love Desire". "You're the One" peaked at No. 11 on the Billboard Hot Dance Music/Maxi-Single Sales in 1987 and single "Notice Me" peaked at No. 9 on the Billboard Hot Dance Music/Club Play chart in 1989.

Death
On December 15, 2008, Sandée died in Hollywood, Florida, at age 46. Services were held at Fred Hunter's funeral home.

Discography

Studio albums

Singles

References

External links
[ Billboard Chart]

1962 births
2008 deaths
American freestyle musicians
Exposé (group) members
20th-century American singers
20th-century American women singers
Neurological disease deaths in Florida
Deaths from epilepsy
21st-century American women